Brezovice is a village in the municipality of Krupanj in western Serbia. According to the 2002 census, the village has a population of 964 people.

Historical population

1948: 1,631
1953: 1,677
1961: 1,520
1971: 1,362
1981: 1,186
1991: 1,066
2002: 964

References

See also
List of places in Serbia

Populated places in Mačva District